William George Judd (1847 – 6 December 1929) was an Australian politician.

Known as George Judd, he was born in Sydney to labourer James Judd and Selina Matthews. He ran a store at St Peters before entering politics, and also ran a brick and tile company. On 15 February 1869 he married Eleanor Eliza Howard, with whom he had four children. In 1885 he was elected to the New South Wales Legislative Assembly for Canterbury, but he did not re-contest in 1887. Judd died at Arncliffe in 1929.

References

 

1847 births
1929 deaths
Members of the New South Wales Legislative Assembly
Mayors of places in New South Wales